Navar or Navor or Naver ( or ) may refer to:
 Navar, Hamadan (نوار - Navār)
 Navar, West Azerbaijan (ناور - Nāvar)